Maasniel is a neighbourhood of Roermond in the Dutch province of Limburg. It is located east of the city centre.

Maasniel used to be a separate village. It was a separate municipality until 1959, when it was merged with Roermond.

References

Former municipalities of Limburg (Netherlands)
Roermond